Qingxu Daode Zhenju (Chinese: 清虛道德真君; Pinyin: Qīngxū Dàodé Zhēnjūn) a character featured within the famed classic Chinese novel Investiture of the Gods.

Daode Zhenjun is the renowned superiorman of Mount Green Top, Purple Cave. At one point in time during the Yang Ren incident, Zhenjun would realize that Yang Ren's time is not yet over and he thus needs to exist for a longer period of time. Due to this, Insouciant would unleash his Yellow Kerchiefed Genie to scoop up Yang Ren and effectively bring him to his mountain by creating a large dust storm. Next, Insouciant would place a set amount of magic on both of Yang Ren's eyes (because Yang Ren previously had his eyes removed as punishment by King Zhou of Shang). Following this, Zhenjun would blow on Yang Ren's face and tell him to awaken. Following this point, Zhenjun would have Yang Ren as his disciple for the remainder of his allotted time.

When Huang Feihu had been surrounded by Wen Zhong's forces, Zhenjun would engulf Huang and his entourage in a sleep-inducing fog and would then move them outside the valley. As seen following this, Zhenjun has the ability to create clone forms of any individual at will (due to his magic gourd). Some time later when Huang had been struck in the arm by Chen Tong's magical dart, Zhenjun would summon his disciple, Huang Tianhua, and tell him to quickly save his father—who is in trouble. Before the leave of his disciple, Zhenjun would first hand Tianhua a flower basket, his non-evil sword, and tell him to hurry back once his objective is completed.

References
 Investiture of the Gods chapter 19 and 31

Chinese gods
Investiture of the Gods characters